Clivina simplicifrons is a species of ground beetle in the subfamily Scaritinae. It was described by Fairmaire in 1901.

References

simplicifrons
Beetles described in 1901